Gangajatra (also known in English as The Journey) is a Bangladeshi film written and directed by Syed Wahiduzzaman Diamond. This film was shown at "Kolkata International Film Festival" in 2010.

Plot
Rupa's (Shimla) husband sells her and her daughter Nipa (Sabrina) to a whore house for money. There Rupa wants to get back her usual life and believed her client Ratan (Sacchu) but he betrayed with her. in the meantime, whore house owner insists her to serve the clients in front of her child. As a result, she gets frustrated with her life and commit suicide along with her child. Prokash (Ferdous) and Sudhamoni (Popy) carried these two dead body for funeral. But people of the society impede them; even those two corpse do not get any government land. Now, it's time for Prokash and Sudhamoni to make a proper funeral of them.

Cast
 Ferdous Ahmed - Prokash
 Sadika Parvin Popy - Sudhamoni
 Shimla - Rupa
 Shahidul Islam Sacchu - Ratan
 Syeda Wahida Sabrina - Nipa

Soundtrack
The music of this film was directed by Emon Saha and lyrics were penned by Mohammad Hossain Jemmy and Syed Wahiduzzaman Diamond. 
 Jeona Jeona Shyam - Kanak Chapa
 Uira Uira Jaay - Kanak Chapa

Awards
This film won National Film Awards in eight categories and Bachsas Awards in seven categories

References

External links
 Gangajatra at the Bangla Movie Database
 Gangajatra at the Proteep Blog

2009 films
2009 drama films
Bengali-language Bangladeshi films
Films scored by Emon Saha
2000s Bengali-language films
Impress Telefilm films